The 1970 Japan Series was the 21st edition of Nippon Professional Baseball's postseason championship series. It matched the Central League champion Yomiuri Giants against the Pacific League champion Lotte Orions. The Giants defeated the Orions in five games to win their sixth consecutive championship.

Summary

See also
1970 World Series

References

Japan Series
Chiba Lotte Marines
Yomiuri Giants
Japan Series
Japan Series
Japan Series
Japan Series